Annabel Ritchie (born 20 July 1978) is a retired rower from New Zealand.

Private life
Ritchie was born in New Zealand and attended Rangi Ruru Girls' School in Christchurch from 1994 to 1996. She studied at Victoria University of Wellington and graduated LLB. She lived in Queenstown where she worked as a lawyer in private practice.

Rowing career
Ritchie made the New Zealand U19 coxless four to compete at the 1996 World Rowing Junior Championships in Motherwell, Scotland, where the Jude Hamilton-coached crew won a bronze medal. At the 1998 World Rowing Championships in Cologne, Germany, she came seventh with the women's eight. At the next World Rowing Championships a year later in St. Catharines, Ontario, Canada, she came eighth with the women's eight.

She attended the University of Washington, USA, and was part of the crew which won back-to-back National Collegiate Athletic Association (NCAA) championship titles. Her Husky team included Athens Olympic silver medallists and Beijing and London gold medallists Mary Murray (née Whipple) and Anna Cummins (née Mickelson) (USA), and Olympians Rika Geyser (South Africa) and Nicole Borges (Canada).

In 2012 to 2014, she was a rowing coach for the Wakatipu club in Queenstown.

References

New Zealand female rowers
1978 births
Living people
People from Geraldine, New Zealand
People educated at Rangi Ruru Girls' School
Washington Huskies women's rowers
People from Queenstown, New Zealand
21st-century New Zealand lawyers
New Zealand women lawyers
21st-century women lawyers
Sportspeople from Canterbury, New Zealand